Jacob Paul Tapper (born March 12, 1969) is an American journalist, author, and cartoonist. He is the lead Washington anchor for CNN, hosts the weekday television news show The Lead with Jake Tapper, and co-hosts the Sunday morning public affairs program State of the Union.

Before joining CNN, Tapper worked for ABC News as Senior White House Correspondent, where he received three Merriman Smith Memorial Awards from the White House Correspondents' Association. Tapper helped with the coverage of the inauguration of President Obama that earned an Emmy Award for Outstanding Live Coverage of a Current News Story. Tapper was part of a team that was awarded an Edward R. Murrow Award for Video: Breaking News for "Target bin Laden: The Death of Public Enemy #1". His book The Outpost: An Untold Story of American Valor debuted at number 10 in November 2012 on The New York Times Best Seller list for hardback non-fiction. Tapper's book and his reporting on the veterans and troops were cited when the Congressional Medal of Honor Society awarded him the "Tex" McCrary Award for Excellence in Journalism.

The Republican primary debate Tapper moderated in September 2015 drew more than 23 million viewers, making it the most-watched program in the history of CNN and the second-most watched primary debate ever. He also moderated the Republican presidential debate in Miami on March 10, 2016, which drew almost 12 million viewers and, according to Variety, "garnered acclaim for its substance".

Early life
Tapper was born in New York City and was raised in Queen Village, Philadelphia. He is the son of Theodore S. "Ted" and Helen Anne (née Palmatier) Tapper. His mother, who is originally from Canada, retired as a psychiatric nurse at the Philadelphia Veterans Affairs Medical Center. His father, from Chicago, graduated from Dartmouth College and Harvard Medical School and went on to serve as the president of South Philadelphia Pediatrics and associate clinical professor of pediatrics at Jefferson Medical College. His parents are Jewish; his mother, who was raised Presbyterian, converted to Judaism. When Tapper was a kid he spent summers attending the Jewish summer camp Camp Ramah in the Poconos.

Tapper attended the Philadelphia School, a progressive, independent elementary school known for its weekly out of classroom excursions to farms, etc. In eighth grade he did a comic strip for a local free weekly paper. He later enrolled at Akiba Hebrew Academy, an independent Jewish day school formerly located in Merion, Pennsylvania, and attended Dartmouth College, from which he graduated Phi Beta Kappa and magna cum laude with a B.A. in history, modified by Visual Studies, in 1991. At Dartmouth, Tapper was a member of Alpha Chi Alpha fraternity. He briefly attended the USC School of Cinematic Arts.

Career
In 1992, Tapper served as a Campaign Press Secretary for Democratic congressional candidate Marjorie Margolies-Mezvinsky (PA-13) and later served as her congressional press secretary. Tapper also worked for Powell Tate, a Washington, D.C., public relations firm run by Democrat Jody Powell and Republican Sheila Tate. He was a spokesman for Hooters, a restaurant chain that features scantily clad women as servers. Tapper also worked for Handgun Control, Inc. (now the Brady Center to Prevent Gun Violence) in 1997.

Tapper wrote several articles as a freelance writer and then began his full-time journalism career in 1998; for two years, he was a Senior Writer for the Washington City Paper. While there, Tapper wrote an article about going on a date with Monica Lewinsky, which skewered Washington's culture of scandal. Tapper won a Society of Professional Journalists award for his work at the Washington City Paper.

Tapper was the Washington Correspondent for Salon.com from 1999 to 2002. Tapper's reports about Enron were nominated for a 2002 Columbia University School of Journalism online award, and he was an early questioner of the Bush administration's claims about Iraq having weapons of mass destruction.

In 2001, Tapper was the host of the CNN news talk show, Take Five. Tapper was also a columnist for TALK Magazine, and has written for The New Yorker, The New York Times Magazine, The Washington Post, the Los Angeles Times, The Weekly Standard, and other publications. Tapper was a frequent contributor to National Public Radio's All Things Considered and his work was included in "The Best American Political Writing 2002." Tapper was the correspondent for a series of VH1 news specials in 2002.

ABC News

ABC News hired Tapper in 2003. While working there, Tapper covered a range of topics including work in the ABC News Baghdad bureau, from New Orleans after the failure of the levees after Hurricane Katrina, and from Afghanistan. From March to July 2010, Tapper was interim anchor of ABC's This Week, hosting the program until Christiane Amanpour became This Weeks anchor.

Tapper was named Senior White House Correspondent on November 5, 2008, the day after the 2008 presidential election. In 2010, 2011, and 2012, the White House Correspondents' Association awarded him the Merriman Smith Memorial Award for presidential coverage under deadline pressure. He was a key part of the ABC News coverage of the inauguration of President Obama that was awarded an Emmy Award for Outstanding Live Coverage of a Current News Story.

Tapper was passed over as a candidate to replace George Stephanopoulos, who, like Tapper entered the news business following a career as a Democratic campaign operative, as anchor of This Week when Stephanopoulos was chosen to replace Diane Sawyer as co-host of Good Morning America after she became the anchor of World News. CNN's Christiane Amanpour was selected as Stephanopoulos' replacement instead. Tapper served as the interim anchor until Amanpour took over the show on August 1, 2010. He was passed over again when Stephanopoulous decided he wanted to return to the position.

Tapper contributed regularly to Good Morning America, Nightline, and World News with Diane Sawyer. In addition to anchoring World News and Good Morning America weekend editions and Nightline, Tapper was a frequent substitute host of This Week and served as interim host for much of 2010, scoring the first TV interview with CIA director Leon Panetta, as well as exclusives with Vice President Biden, White House Chief of Staff Rahm Emanuel, retired General Colin Powell, and former Federal Reserve chairman Alan Greenspan, in addition to interviews with other newsmakers such as House Majority Leader Steny Hoyer, D-Maryland, House Minority Leader John Boehner, R-Ohio, and Senate Minority Leader Mitch McConnell.

As senior White House correspondent, Tapper interviewed President Obama several times. Before his assignment at the White House, Tapper was ABC News' national/senior political correspondent based in the network's Washington, D.C., bureau. He contributed a report to a broadcast of World News Tonight with Peter Jennings that won the 2005 Edward R. Murrow Award for best network newscast. As ABC News' lead reporter covering the 2008 presidential election, he received recognition for both breaking stories and even-handedness. Traveling from Iowa to New Hampshire to South Carolina and beyond, Tapper interviewed both Republican presidential nominee Sen. John McCain, R-Ariz., and presumptive Democratic presidential nominee Sen. Barack Obama, D-Ill., as well as other White House hopefuls including former Sen. John Edwards, D-N.C., former New York Mayor Rudy Giuliani, former Arkansas Governor Mike Huckabee, New Mexico Governor Bill Richardson, and former Massachusetts Governor Mitt Romney.

CNN
It was announced December 20, 2012, that Tapper would join CNN and would anchor a new weekday program and serve as the network's chief Washington correspondent. He began with CNN in January 2013, hosting his own program, The Lead with Jake Tapper.

The Lead with Jake Tapper won three National Headliner Awards for its reporting in 2013. Among broadcast television networks, cable networks and syndicators, The Lead with Jake Tapper won first prize for its coverage of the Boston Marathon bombing and second prize for its coverage of the Oklahoma tornadoes in the category of "Coverage of a major news event." It won third prize for its coverage of the Boston Marathon bombing in the category of "Continuing coverage of a major news event." In 2014, The Lead was honored for a series of reports on academic fraud at the University of North Carolina at Chapel Hill by correspondent Sara Ganim with a Society of Professional Journalists' Sigma Delta Chi Award for Investigative Reporting.

In June 2015, Tapper became host of CNN's Sunday political show, State of the Union with Jake Tapper. There, he has become known for challenging politicians of all stripes, including challenging Senator Bernie Sanders to release his tax returns; asking Jeb Bush why Hillary Clinton is responsible for Benghazi if his brother George W. Bush bears no responsibility for the terrorist attacks on 9/11; asking Hillary Clinton about the FBI investigation into her private email server; and asking Donald Trump if he would denounce support from white supremacists, the Ku Klux Klan, and David Duke referred to days later as "the infamous Tapper-Trump exchange" by Mitt Romney in his March 2016 speech condemning Trump.

On September 16, 2015, Tapper moderated two Republican primary debates from the Ronald Reagan Presidential Library in Simi Valley, California. The main debate drew an average of 23.1 million viewers, making it the most watched program in the history of CNN and the second most watched primary debate ever. He also moderated the March 10, 2016 Republican presidential debate in Miami, which drew almost 12 million viewers and according to Variety "garnered acclaim for its substance."

In 2017, he received the Walter Cronkite Award for Excellence in Television Political Journalism from the USC Annenberg School for Communication and Journalism. Also in 2017, he received the John F. Hogan Distinguished Service Award from the Radio Television Digital News Association.

In 2018, Tapper was part of a four-person team at CNN that included Carl Bernstein, Jim Sciutto, and Evan Perez that won the Merriman Smith Award for broadcast reporting on the White House under deadline pressure.

In August 2019, Democratic Rep. Rashida Tlaib criticized Tapper for "comparing Palestinian human rights advocates to terrorist white nationalists," calling it "fundamentally a lie." In response, Tapper said that "those who believe Palestinian leaders bear responsibility for the incitement of terrorism cannot then let US leaders off the hook and act as if words don't matter".

Following the contentious first 2020 presidential election debate, Tapper garnered attention for his response. He called it a "hot mess inside a dumpster fire inside a train wreck". Later that year, he was criticized for acting unethically by secretly advising a Pennsylvania politician.

In January 2021, before the Inauguration of Joe Biden, CNN announced that Tapper's role would expand to be the network's "lead anchor for all major Washington events," including election nights. Additionally, they announced that Dana Bash would join Tapper as a co-host on State of the Union, alternating hosting weeks.

In 2023, it was revealed Tapper's top producer was fired by CNN for sexual misconduct.

Other programs and media
Tapper has contributed to GQ, The Weekly Standard, NPR's All Things Considered, The New York Times, and The Washington Post. In 2001, he hosted the program Take Five on CNN, in which young journalists and commentators discussed politics and pop culture. In 2002, he hosted a series of entertainment news specials on VH1, and in 2003 he hosted shows focused on independent film on the Sundance Channel. Tapper has also been a guest on Jimmy Kimmel Live, The Colbert Report, Late Night with Seth Meyers, Conan, The View, Real Time with Bill Maher, and appeared on the Judge John Hodgman podcast as guest bailiff, standing in for regular bailiff Jesse Thorn during the August 31, 2011 episode entitled "De Plane".

Tapper made a cameo in the Halloween-themed episode of The Rookie (October 30, 2022). He wore a Mike Schmidt Philadelphia Phillies jersey — the MVP of the 1980 World Series. Tapper's son, Jack Tapper appeared alongside him, dressed up as Tom Hanks’ character Captain Miller from Saving Private Ryan. Tapper and his son watched the show together while locked down due to COVID-19, and he wanted to share his appreciation for the program so Tapper posted a Tweet to Nathan Fillion. According to Tapper, Fillion wrote back and invited the pair for a set visit once COVID protocols were eased. Just before the visit Fillion asked whether the father and son wanted to film a cameo on the show.

Published works

On April 24, 2018, Little, Brown and Company published Tapper's first novel, a political thriller entitled The Hellfire Club. The novel follows a fictitious freshman Congressman discovering corruption and conspiracy in 1950s Washington, at the height of the McCarthy era. The book debuted at Number 3 on the New York Times Best-Seller List for Hardcover fiction, and remained on the Best-Seller list for four weeks total. The Associated Press called The Hellfire Club "insightful...well-written and worthwhile." Tablet Magazine called the novel "startlingly good." USA Today said the author "sizzles" and "proves he has the page-turning knack in his entertaining debut novel." The sequel to The Hellfire Club, The Devil May Dance, was released in May 2021, and continues the story of the lives of Charlie and Margaret Marder.

Tapper is also the author of The Outpost: An Untold Story of American Valor, a critically acclaimed book about U.S. troops in Afghanistan that debuted at number 10 on The New York Times Best Seller list for hardback non-fiction. Bob Woodward described the book as "Brilliant, dedicated reporting by a journalist who goes to ground to get the truth. A sad, real tale about this war, America and the brave warriors who live—and die—at the point of the spear" and Jon Krakauer called it "a mind-boggling, all-too-true story of heroism, hubris, failed strategy, and heartbreaking sacrifice. If you want to understand how the war in Afghanistan went off the rails, you need to read this book." In 2014, the Congressional Medal of Honor Society recognized Tapper for the book and his reporting on military topics in general with the Tex McCrary Award for Excellence in Journalism. A Rod Lurie-directed film adaptation of The Outpost was released in July 2020, starring Milo Gibson, Orlando Bloom, Scott Eastwood and Caleb Landry Jones.

In addition to The Outpost, Tapper is the author of Down and Dirty: The Plot to Steal the Presidency, based on the 2000 Presidential election, that The Washington Post called "lively", the Chicago Tribune "a churning effusion well worth reading" and The Daily Telegraph "engrossing". He also wrote Body Slam: The Jesse Ventura Story (St. Martin's Press) that was excerpted by The Washington Post Magazine.

His comic strip Capitol Hell appeared in Roll Call from 1994 to 2003. He has also contributed cartoons to The American Spectator magazine, the Los Angeles Times, and The Philadelphia Inquirer. During the week of May 23, 2016, Tapper guest-illustrated the Dilbert cartoon. The original drawings were auctioned online to raise money for the Homes for our Troops Foundation.

Awards and honors
As the Senior White House Correspondent for ABC News, Tapper was honored with three Merriman Smith Memorial Awards for broadcast journalism. The first Merriman Smith Memorial Award was for reporting noncompliance of laws regulating tax reporting by the Department of Health and Human Services secretary nominee and former Senate majority leader Tom Daschle (D-SD), troubles that ultimately derailed Daschle's nomination. The second was for the 2010 story that President Obama had asked for the resignation of his Director of National Intelligence, Admiral Dennis C. Blair (retired). The third time was for breaking the 2011 story that the ratings agency Standard and Poor's was expected to downgrade the AAA rating for U.S. government debt. As a CNN anchor, he was awarded his fourth Merriman Smith Award in 2018 as part of a team that broke the news that President-elect Donald Trump and President Barack Obama had been briefed on the Steele dossier alleging that Russia had blackmail material on Donald Trump.

In 2017, Tapper won several awards, including the Walter Cronkite Award for Excellence in Political Journalism. The judges pointed to his fearless advocacy for the truth and relentless interviewing-style. He also won RTDNA's John F. Hogan Distinguished Service Award, which "recognizes an individual's contributions to the journalism profession and freedom of the press", as well as CJF's Tribute Award which awards those who uphold the highest standards of journalism and inspire journalists around the world.Moment Magazine awarded him their inaugural Robert S. Greenberger Journalism Award for his "relentless quest for the truth and accountability". The Dartmouth Club of Washington awarded him the Daniel Webster Award for Distinguished Public Service.

In 2018, Tapper won a Vetty, recognizing his coverage of veterans' issues. He's served alongside press corps veterans in Washington, D.C. for 14 years.

On July 6, 2009, former MSNBC television personality (and current ABC legal analyst) Dan Abrams launched a website service, Mediaite, reporting on media figures, ranking all TV-based journalists in America by influence; for December 2010, Tapper ranked at number one. He remains a mainstay of the annual list, most recently recognized in 2018 for his "ability to hold Republicans and Democrats to account equally" and "his 2018 noteworthy moments; the harrowing Parkland town hall, a stellar one-on-one with James Comey, and his regular sparring matches with Trump officials."

In 2016, The Lead was honored with two National Headliner Awards: Best Newscast (Broadcast television networks, cable networks, and syndicators) and Best Coverage of a Major News Event (Broadcast television networks, cable networks, and syndicators newscast) for the show's coverage of the November 2015 Paris attacks.

The Los Angeles Press Club awarded Tapper its 2017 President's Award for Impact on Media. "During a divisive election, Jake Tapper was willing to take on politicians from both sides of the aisle," the Press Club president said. "His effective interview style cuts to the core. He is willing to ask the tough questions, listen carefully, and then follow up with precisely the right response to get to the heart of the matter."

Tapper also has two honorary degrees from UMass Amherst and Dartmouth.

Personal life
Tapper went on a date with Monica Lewinsky in December 1997, a few weeks before news broke of the Clinton–Lewinsky scandal. He wrote about the experience in a January 1998 issue of the Washington City Paper and the two later discussed the date on an Oct. 5, 2021 episode of his CNN program, "The Lead with Jake Tapper."

In 2006, Tapper married Jennifer Marie Brown, a former Planned Parenthood official, in her home state of Missouri. They reside in Washington, D.C. with their two children Alice and Jack.  Alice, at ages 9 through 11, created a Girl Scout Raise Your Hand patch, wrote a related New York Times op-ed and a picture book, Raise Your Hand, to encourage girls to be more confident in school, which she mentioned on the Ellen Degeneres Show.

Tapper is a lifelong fan of the Philadelphia Phillies, Philadelphia Flyers, Philadelphia Eagles, and Philadelphia 76ers. Following Super Bowl LII, where the Eagles beat the New England Patriots 41–33, Tapper, who had attended the game in person, called in to New Day with Alisyn Camerota and John Berman as a “mystery guest” to gloat about the Eagles’ victory to Berman (a Massachusetts native and lifelong Patriots fan). Berman congratulated Tapper on the Eagles’ victory.

References

External links

 
 The Lead with Jake Tapper
 CNN profile
 

1969 births
ABC News personalities
Jack M. Barrack Hebrew Academy alumni
American cartoonists
American male journalists
American newspaper reporters and correspondents
American people of Canadian descent
American political writers
American television reporters and correspondents
CNN people
Dartmouth College alumni
Jewish American journalists
Jewish American writers
Journalists from New York City
Journalists from Washington, D.C.
Living people
Television anchors from Philadelphia
USC School of Cinematic Arts alumni
Writers from Philadelphia
21st-century American Jews